Shamsuddin Ahmed was an Independent politician and the former Member of Parliament of Mymensingh-6.

Career
Ahmed was elected to parliament from Mymensingh-6 as an Independent candidate in 2001. In 2018, he was nominated by Bangladesh Nationalist Party to contest the 11th parliamentary election.

Death 
Ahmed died on 8 May 2020.

See also
 Shahabuddin Degree College
 Begum Fazilatunnecha Mujib Government Mohila College

References

Independent politicians in Bangladesh
8th Jatiya Sangsad members
2020 deaths
Year of birth missing